Vico Thai is an Australian actor, He is known for his role as Justin Yang on ABC TV’s award winning drama series Total Control and as Riz in Foxtel's Dangerous TV series. His other notable roles include starring as Chau in the international feature film Mother Fish and as Quang in Matchbox Pictures and NBC Universals original mini series for SBS called Hungry Ghosts.

Early life
Thai was born in Saigon, Vietnam, and raised in Sydney in the suburb of Bankstown. He is of Vietnamese, Chinese and French ancestry. He began performing at an early age before receiving a prestigious national scholarship to study at the Australian Theatre for Young People (ATYP). Thai was nominated by the Ten Network for a National Young Achiever Award for his achievements in performance.

In 2002, Thai's younger sister Jenny Thai (1997–2002) died from her second open heart surgery.

Career
Thai's early roles include his breakout performance as a guest star on Young Lions, screened on the Nine Network. Thai's next role came as a regular lead, cast as one of the stars on Foxtel's AFI nominated show Dangerous (TV series) starring alongside Joel Edgerton. Vico’s roles continued, appearing next in the internationally acclaimed series East West 101 with guest appearances in cult series Underbelly, award-winning comedy Review with Myles Barlow and guest starring alongside Guy Pearce in the acclaimed mini series Jack Irish. 

As a child of refugee parents Vico has dedicated time to his community by helping raise awareness through collaborating with local and international artists and creatives. In 2009 Vico volunteered to collaborate and star in a feature film called Mother Fish, based on the Vietnam war and the plight of refugees. It was selected for the 2009 Sydney Film Festival. The film received rave reviews and was awarded the CRC award at the festival. 

Recently Thai has continued his work with guests roles on ABC’s Rake TV series and international crime mystery thriller series Harrow. Thai was recently cast as a lead in Hungry Ghosts as Quang, premiering on SBS. In 2021 Vico Thai was cast as a lead alongside award winning actresses Rachel Griffiths and Debra Mailman in the second season of Total Control.

Filmography
 TV Series

 Films

External links

References

Living people
1980 births
Australian male television actors
Australian people of Chinese descent
Australian male film actors
Hoa people